Sofia Vitória Inácio (born 28 April 1979 in Setúbal, Portugal) is a Portuguese singer. Prior to recording her debut album "Palavra de Mulher", she performed in Portugal's main concert halls, as well as in Brazil, Spain, the Netherlands, Italy, Macao, Wales and Turkey.

Sofia is strongly influenced not only by Jazz but also by World Music. She released her first record in partnership with pianist Luís Figueiredo. All the songs included in the album "Palavra de Mulher" tell the story of feminine characters who inhabit Chico Buarque's musical world.

Discography 
Sofia Vitória & Luís Figueiredo – "Palavra de Mulher" (Numérica, 2012)

Collaborations 

Luís Figueiredo – "Lado B" (Sintoma Records, 2012)

Comments 
About "Palavra de Mulher"

"It has been a long time since I have listened to the work of Chico in such an original and modern way, and at the same time with an intense sophistication and talent."
Ivan Lins (liner notes of the album)

External links 
Sofia Vitória | Official Website
Sofia Vitória | Facebook
Sofia Vitória | MySpace

1979 births
Living people
Eurovision Song Contest entrants of 2004
People from Setúbal
Eurovision Song Contest entrants for Portugal
21st-century Portuguese women singers